Adolphe-Maria Gustave Hardy (23 July 1920 – 9 August 2011) was a French prelate of the Roman Catholic Church who served as bishop 
of the Diocese of Beauvais, France from 1985 to 1995.

Biography
Hardy was born in Nantes, France, and was ordained a priest on 31 March 1945. Hardy was appointed bishop of the Diocese of Beauvais on 13 April 1985 and was ordained bishop on 12 May 1985. Hardy continued serving the Diocese of Beauvais until his retirement on 13 May 1995.

See also

External links
Catholic-Hierarchy
Diocese of Beauvais (French)

20th-century Roman Catholic bishops in France
Bishops of Beauvais
1920 births
2011 deaths